The administrative divisions of the Republic of Artsakh are of two types; provinces and cities. There are six provinces and one special administrative city - the capital of the Republic.

Municipalities in Artsakh are divided into 2 categories: urban communities and rural communities. Before the 2020 war, there were 10 towns (urban) and 322  villages (rural) in Artsakh.

Administrative divisions 
These divisions include territory controlled by Azerbaijan, which are officially considered occupied by Artsakh.

 Totally under Azerbaijani control.
 Partially under Azerbaijani control.

Azerbaijan divisions and claimed territories

Before the Artsakh republic was established, the territory was organized by the Republic of Azerbaijan into a number of rayons (districts). Artsakh extended its provinces across the border of the former Nagorno-Karabakh Autonomous Oblast (NKAO), removing the administrative distinction between the two areas. The following districts, which were not part of the NKAO but were in Azerbaijan proper, were completely within the de facto borders of Artsakh before the 2020 Nagorno-Karabakh war: Lachin, Qubadli, Zangilan, Jabrayil, Kalbajar. Additionally, parts of the following districts were partly under the control of Artsakh: Agdam District and Fuzuli District.

Pre-2020 war

Before the 2020 Nagorno-Karabakh war, there were seven provinces. The districts of Azerbaijan surrounding Nagorno-Karabakh that were administered by Artsakh were: Lachin District, Qubadli District, Zangilan District, Jabrayil District and Kalbajar District, as well as parts of Agdam, and Fuzuli District. On the other hand, the eastern ends of Martakert and Martuni were under Azerbaijani control.

See also

 Administrative divisions of Armenia

References 

 
Artsakh
Artsakh